Jīva or Ātman is a philosophical term used within Jainism to identify the soul. As per Jain cosmology, jīva or soul is the principle of sentience and is one of the tattvas or one of the fundamental substances forming part of the universe. The Jain metaphysics, states Jagmanderlal Jaini, divides the universe into two independent, everlasting, co-existing and uncreated categories called the jiva (soul) and the ajiva ( non-soul). This basic premise of Jainism makes it a dualistic philosophy. The jiva, according to Jainism, is an essential part of how the process of karma, rebirth and the process of liberation from rebirth works.

Soul substance 
Jains regard soul as one of the six fundamental and eternal substances (dravyas) which forms the universe. The two states of soul substance are mentioned in the Jain texts. These are — Svābhva (pure or natural) and Vibhāva (impure or unnatural state). Souls in transmigration are in impure state and liberated ones are said to be in natural or pure state.

Jain philosophy is the oldest Indian philosophy that completely separates matter from the soul. According to The Theosophist, "some religionists hold that Atman (Spirit) and Paramatman (God) are identical, while others assert that they are distinct; but a Jain will say that Atman and Paramatman are identical as well as distinct."

The five vows of Jain practice are believed in Jainism to aid in freeing the jīva from karmic matter, reduce negative karmic effects and accrue positive karmic benefits.

Souls and rebirth 

According to Jain philosophy, rebirth occurs through soul. Depending on the karmic particles attached to a soul, Jain theology states a being is reborn in one of four gatis (states of existence), namely, heavenly being (deva), human (manushya), hell being (naraki) and animals and plants (triyancha). Besides this there also exist a sub-microscopic life form, Nigoda, possessing only one sense, i.e., of touch.

In Jain beliefs, souls begin their journey in a primordial state, and exist in a state of consciousness continuum that is constantly evolving through Saṃsāra. Some evolve to a higher state, some regress asserts the Jaina theory, a movement that is driven by the karma. Further, Jaina traditions believe that there exist Abhavya (incapable), or a class of souls that can never attain moksha (liberation). The Abhavya state of soul is entered after an intentional and shockingly evil act. Jainism considers souls as pluralistic each in a karma-samsara cycle, and does not subscribe to Advaita style nondualism of Hinduism, or Advaya style nondualism of Buddhism.

The Jaina theosophy, like ancient Ajivika, but unlike Hindu and Buddhist theosophies, asserts that each soul passes through 8,400,000 birth-situations, as they circle through Saṃsāra. As the soul cycles, states Padmanabh Jaini, Jainism traditions believe that it goes through five types of bodies: earth bodies, water bodies, fire bodies, air bodies and vegetable lives. With all human and non-human activities, such as rainfall, agriculture, eating and even breathing, minuscule living beings are taking birth or dying, their souls are believed to be constantly changing bodies. Perturbing, harming or killing any life form, including any human being, is considered a sin in Jainism, with negative karmic effects.

A liberated soul in Jainism is one who has gone beyond Saṃsāra, is at the apex, is omniscient, remains there eternally, and is known as a Siddha. A male human being is considered closest to the apex with the potential to achieve liberation, particularly through asceticism. Women must gain karmic merit, to be reborn as man, and only then can they achieve spiritual liberation in Jainism, particularly in the Digambara sect of Jainism; however, this view has been historically debated within Jainism and different Jaina sects have expressed different views, particularly the Shvetambara sect that believes that women too can achieve liberation from Saṃsāra.

In contrast to Buddhist texts which do not expressly or unambiguously condemn injuring or killing plants and minor life forms, Jaina texts do. Jainism considers it a bad karma to injure plants and minor life forms with negative impact on a soul's . However, some texts in Buddhism and Hinduism do caution a person from injuring all life forms, including plants and seeds.

Real Self 
According to the Jain text, Samayasāra:

According to Vijay Jain, the souls which rest on the pure self are called the Real Self, and only arihant and Siddhas are the Real Self.

Stages of spiritual development

Jain texts explain that there are fourteen stages of spiritual development called Gunasthana. These are:

Mithyadristi: The stage of wrong believer
Sasādana: downfall from right faith
Misradrsti: mixed right and wrong belief
Avirata samyagdrsti: vowless right belief
Deśavirata: The stage of partial self-control
Pramattasamyata: Slightly imperfect vows
Apramatta samyata: Perfect vows
Apūrvakaraņa: New thought-activity
Anivāttibādara-sāmparāya: advanced thought-activity (Passions are still occurring)
Sukshma samparaya: slightest delusion
Upaśānta-kasaya: subsided delusion
Ksīna kasāya: destroyed delusion
Sayogi kevali: Omniscience with vibration
Ayogi kevali: The stage of omniscience without any activity

Classification
According to Jainism, sentient beings are ranked based on their senses. Four basic elements, viz. earth, water, air and fire ranks among the lowest in them.

See also
 Atma Siddhi
 Atman (Buddhism)
 Atman (Hinduism)
 God in Jainism
 Ratnatraya- Three Jewels of Jainism

References

Citation

Sources

External links
 The Jaina Philosophy, The Jīvas, Surendranath Dasgupta, 1940

Jain philosophy
Conceptions of self